In coding theory, generalized minimum-distance (GMD) decoding provides an efficient algorithm for decoding concatenated codes, which is based on using an errors-and-erasures decoder for the outer code.

A naive decoding algorithm for concatenated codes can not be an optimal way of decoding because it does not take into account the information that maximum likelihood decoding (MLD) gives. In other words, in the naive algorithm, inner received codewords are treated the same regardless of the difference between their hamming distances. Intuitively, the outer decoder should place higher confidence in symbols whose inner encodings are close to the received word. David Forney in 1966 devised a better algorithm called generalized minimum distance (GMD) decoding which makes use of those information better. This method is achieved by measuring confidence of each received codeword, and erasing symbols whose confidence is below a desired value. And GMD decoding algorithm was one of the first examples of soft-decision decoders. We will present three versions of the GMD decoding algorithm. The first two will be randomized algorithms while the last one will be a deterministic algorithm.

Setup
 Minimum distance: Let  be a code. The minimum distance of code  is defined to be  where 
 Code concatenation: Given , consider two codes which we call outer code and inner code 

 Maximum likelihood decoding (MLD): MLD is a decoding method for error correcting codes, which outputs the codeword closest to the received word in Hamming distance. For every .
 Expected value: The expected value of a discrete random variable  is

Randomized algorithm
Consider the received word  which was corrupted by a noisy channel. The following is the algorithm description for the general case.

Randomized_Decoder
Given : .
 For every , compute .
 Set .
 For every , repeat : With probability , set  otherwise set .

Theorem 1. Let y be a received word such that there exists a codeword  such that . Then the deterministic GMD algorithm outputs .

Note that a naive decoding algorithm for concatenated codes can correct up to  errors.

Lemma 1. Let the assumption in Theorem 1 hold. And if  has  errors and  erasures (when compared with ) after Step 1, then 

Remark. If , then the algorithm in Step 2 will output . The lemma above says that in expectation, this is indeed the case. Note that this is not enough to prove Theorem 1, but can be crucial in developing future variations of the algorithm.

Proof of lemma 1. For every  define  This implies that

Next for every , we define two indicator variables:

 

We claim that we are done if we can show that for every :

 

Clearly, by definition

Further, by the linearity of expectation, we get

To prove (2) we consider two cases: -th block is correctly decoded (Case 1),  -th block is incorrectly decoded (Case 2):

Case 1: 

Further, by definition we have

 

Case 2: 

In this case,  and 

Since . This follows another case analysis when  or not.

Finally, this implies

 

In the following sections, we will finally show that the deterministic version of the algorithm above can do unique decoding of  up to half its design distance.

Modified randomized algorithm
Note that, in the previous version of the GMD algorithm in step "3", we do not really need to use "fresh" randomness for each . Now we come up with another randomized version of the GMD algorithm that uses the same randomness for every . This idea follows the algorithm below.

Modified_Randomized_Decoder
Given : , pick  at random. Then every for every :
 Set .
 Compute .
 If , set  otherwise set .

For the proof of Lemma 1, we only use the randomness to show that

 

In this version of the GMD algorithm, we note that

 

The proof of Lemma 1 can be also used to show  for version2 of GMD. In the next section, we will see how to get a deterministic version of the GMD algorithm by choosing  from a polynomially sized set as opposed to the current infinite set .

Deterministic algorithm
Let . Since for each , we have

 

Note that for every , the step 1 of the second version of randomized algorithm outputs the same . This gives the deterministic algorithm below.

Deterministic_Decoder
    Given : , for every , repeat the following.
 Set  for every .
 If , set  otherwise set .
Let  be the codeword in  corresponding to the output of the algorithm, if any.
 Among all the  output in 4, output the one closest to 

Every loop of 1~4 can be run in polynomial time, the algorithm above can also be computed in polynomial time. Specifically, each call to an errors and erasures decoder of  errors takes  time. Finally, the runtime of the algorithm above is  where  is the running time of the outer errors and erasures decoder.

See also
 Concatenated codes
 Reed Solomon error correction
 Welch Berlekamp algorithm

References
 University at Buffalo Lecture Notes on Coding Theory – Atri Rudra
 MIT Lecture Notes on Essential Coding Theory – Madhu Sudan
 University of Washington – Venkatesan Guruswami
 G. David Forney. Generalized Minimum Distance decoding. IEEE Transactions on Information Theory, 12:125–131, 1966

Error detection and correction
Coding theory
Finite fields
Information theory